Brendan Kelly may refer to:

Brendan Kelly (musician) (born 1976), bassist/vocalist of The Lawrence Arms and guitarist/lead vocalist of The Falcon
 (born 1964), Irish-born actor and artist
Brendan Kelly (bishop) (born 1946), Irish prelate of the Roman Catholic Church
 Brendan Kelly (hurler) (born 1968), Irish retired hurler
 Brendan F. Kelly, Director of the Illinois State Police (2019-  )